Northmont High School is a public high school in Clayton, Ohio. It is the primary high school in the Northmont City School District. The school serves approximately 1700 students from the communities of northern Montgomery County, including Clayton, Englewood, Phillipsburg, and Union.

Departments
Applied Technology
Art
Business & Technology
Foreign Language
Health & Physical Education
Language Arts
Mathematics
Navy Junior ROTC
Performing Arts
Science
Social Studies
Special Education
Vocational
Work & Family life

Academics
The Northmont High School's curriculum offers 13 Advanced Placement courses in science (AP Biology, AP Chemistry, AP Physics), mathematics (AP Calculus AB, AP Calculus BC, AP Statistics), social studies (AP Economics, AP United States History, AP United States Government and Politics, AP Human Geography), language arts (AP English Language and Composition, AP Literature and Composition), and the visual/performing arts (AP Music Theory, AP Studio Art: Drawing). Northmont also provides several honors and College Credit Plus courses.

Ohio Academic Competition State Championships 
 2010, 2013, 2014, 2015

Athletics
Northmont is a member of the Greater Western Ohio Conference (GWOC). 

The school's mascot is the Thunderbolt, but its student populace are more colloquially known as the T-Bolts or just the Bolts.  This moniker was unintentionally gained from a basketball commentator in the school system's early years (circa 1960s), who, while watching the high school boys' team racing back and forth across the court, exclaimed that they were zipping back and forth like "thunderbolts."

Ohio High School Athletic Association State Championships
 Boys' Soccer – 1978, 1988
 Boys' Cross Country – 1995, 1996
 Girls' Soccer – 1985, 1987, 1988, 1989

New building
A 5.9 mills levy was placed on the November 8, 2011 ballot to construct a new early learning center and new high school, as well as making improvements to the other buildings in the district. It passed with a 53% yes vote. Construction on the new building began in late 2012 with the relocation of the tennis courts, softball diamonds, and band rehearsal field. The only part of the current building that remained is the school's auditorium, constructed in 1987, which was brought up to code with the new building. Construction was completed and opened to students January 11, 2016.

NJROTC

Northmont NJROTC has won the Area Championships in the last four years straight and has made 9 appearances to Navy Nationals in Pensacola, Florida, including a 10th-place finish in 2010, an 8th-place finish 2011, a 6th-place finish in 2012 and a 9th-place finish in 2016.
The NJROTC program has also earned the distinguished Unit award for the last 9 years and academic honors in 7 of those 9 years.

Marching Band
The Northmont Marching Band has previously been a finalist at the Bands of America Grand National Championships and received Grand-Champions for the MSBA Championships in 2009, 2010, and 2012 in the AAAA Division.

Previous head band directors were Willis R. Cool, Reginald Richwine (1981–2006), David Armbruster (2006–2009), Jim Blankenship (2009–2013), and Andrew Brough (2013–2016).

The head band director is Brian Wissman (2016–Present)

Quiz Bowl

The Northmont Academic Challenge Team won the NAQT State Championship in 2010, 2013 and 2014 and the OAC state championship in 2013 and 2014, giving Northmont the 2nd most quiz bowl state championships in Ohio history (behind only Copley- 7 OAC and 1 NAQT).

In 2011, seniors Michael Czupryn, Brandon Williams, Emily Bingham and Daniel Welch led the Northmont Quiz Bowl team to a 13th-place finish at the 2011 HSNCT. In 2014, junior Sam Blizzard, sophomores Helena and Meghan Jenkins, and freshman Kara Combs led Northmont to a 7th-place finish at the PACE National Championship Tournament.

In 2012 and 2013, Sam Blizzard led Northmont to back-to-back National History Bowl Junior Varsity National Championships in Washington DC, marking Northmont's first ever national championship in any activity. In 2014, coach David Jones was named National History Bowl National Coach of the Year.

Notable alumni
Chris Hero (professional wrestler)
Kurt Coleman (Former safety in the National Football League)
John Seibel (former ESPN anchor)
Zebrie Sanders (Offensive Tackle currently a free agent in the National Football League)
Kenny Hayes (professional basketball player)
Andy Trick (Bass player for The Devil Wears Prada)

References

External links
 Northmont High School official website
 Northmont marching band website
 Northmont NJROTC website

High schools in Montgomery County, Ohio
Public high schools in Ohio
1957 establishments in Ohio